News18 Uttar Pradesh Uttarakhand is a Hindi-language 24/7 social television channel, owned by Network18. The channel is a free-to-air and was launched on 27 January 2002. On 16 March 2018 ETV  Uttar Pradesh Uttarakhand was re-branded News18 Uttar Pradesh Uttarakhand.

See also
 ETV Network
 Network 18
 CNN-News18

References

External links

Hindi-language television channels in India
Television channels and stations established in 2015
Hindi-language television stations
Television channels based in Noida
2015 establishments in Uttar Pradesh
2015 establishments in Uttarakhand
24-hour television news channels in India